Sweat It Out may refer to:

 Sweat It Out (record label), an Australian record label started by Ajax (DJ)
 Sweat It Out (album), a 2008 album by The Pink Spiders
 "Sweat It Out" (The-Dream song), 2009
 "Sweat It Out" (Jimmy Barnes song), 1993